Dov Linzer (Hebrew: דב נתן לינזר; born September 16, 1966) is the President and Rabbinic Head (Rosh HaYeshiva) of the Modern Orthodox Yeshivat Chovevei Torah Rabbinical School in Riverdale, New York. He is a teacher, lecturer, podcaster, and author.

He has a BA in Philosophy from the University of Maryland, Semicha from the Israeli Rabbinate and is a doctoral candidate in Religion at Columbia University. He is an alumnus of Yeshivat Har Etzion and Yeshiva University's Gruss Kollel Elyon. Rabbi Linzer has been a scholar-in-residence in synagogues across the United States, and has published in numerous Talmudic journals and Jewish newspapers. Previously, he headed the Boca Raton Kollel, one of the first Modern Orthodox kollels, for the first two-and-a-half years of its existence.

In 2011, Newsweek ranked him among the 50 most prominent rabbis in the United States,
 stating that "Linzer's students now hold some of the most prominent positions in shuls and Hillels all over the country" and that his school's "alumni will undoubtedly alter the fabric of Modern Orthodoxy."

In 2008, Linzer received the prestigious Avi Chai Fellowship, awarded to emerging communal and educational leaders.

Yeshivat Chovevei Torah 
Linzer has been the Rabbinic Head of Yeshivat Chovevei Torah since its founding in 1999. He was named its dean, assuming ultimate responsibility of both the religious studies and the professional training, in October, 2007. He is recognized as a left leaning, novel styled scholar in the community, and is the primary architect of the school's innovative curriculum. In 2018 Rabbi Linzer was appointed as President of the yeshiva while continuing to serve as its Rabbinic Head. Linzer also teaches Halakha and Jewish Thought to the school's rabbinical students.

In 2008, Linzer's Yeshivat Chovevei Torah, together with JOFA and the Drisha Institute sponsored a conference entitled "Demystifying Sex and Teaching Halacha: A Kallah (Jewish Bridal) Teacher's Workshop," to bring frank talk about sex and sexuality into the requisite classes taken by Orthodox brides prior to their wedding. This conference was held again in 2011, with a second cohort of 15 bridal teachers from around the US and Israel. This event, alongside several others, was seen by large swathes of the mainstream Modern Orthodox world as a proof of a deliberate break from traditional modesty, where these matters are not discussed in public settings in explicit terms.

Linzer delivers a daily Daf Yomi class to men and women, available on iTunes and YouTube.

Two-Ring Ceremony 
In 2003, Linzer wrote an article, "Towards a More Balanced Wedding Ceremony,", describing ways of creating a more gender-balanced wedding ceremony while keeping within the letter of Jewish Law. His most innovative suggestion was that of a halakhic two-ring ceremony, informally known as the "Linzer Two-Ring Ceremony."  A standard Orthodox wedding ceremony has only the groom giving a ring to the bride and does not allow for the bride to give a ring to the groom other than in a purely symbolic fashion after the ceremony was completed. In contrast, Linzer's model has the bride giving a ring immediately after the groom does so, in the presence of witnesses, and serving a substantive halakhic (Jewish legal) function. This ceremony is seeing increasing use among liberal couples.

Public Positions 
Linzer has taken a public stand on a number of controversial issues within the Orthodox Jewish community. In 2006, he was the only Orthodox rabbi to go on record supporting the naming of Dina Najman as spiritual leader of the Orthodox congregation, Kehilat Orach Eliezer.

Linzer, together with his wife, Devorah Zlochower, has been outspoken about the Orthodox community's responsibility to address children of special needs in its schools, synagogues and communal institutions, .   At Linzer's Chovevei Torah, rabbinical students receive special training in inclusion for people with physical, developmental and learning disabilities.

In 2010, a paper commissioned by the Rabbinical Council of America voiced serious reservations as to the validity of brain-stem death as the Jewish legal definition of death.  The rejection of this definition would make almost all organ-transplants forbidden by Jewish Law. Linzer authored a "Rabbinic Statement Regarding Organ Donation and Brain Death", reaffirming the legitimacy of the brain-death definition and critiquing those who would be prepared to receive organs but refuse to donate them.  This statement was signed by over 100 rabbis, including some of the most prominent Modern Orthodox rabbis in the U.S. and Israel. The RCA subsequently backed away from the implications of its paper. The Agudath Israel of America then issued a statement which affirmed the halakhic validity of the original 2010 paper commissioned by the RCA as reflecting the position of "a majority of major poskim today". This, in turn, prompted Tradition (journal) to publish a philosophical analysis of the merits of both Rabbi Linzer's and the Agudath Israel of America's respective statements.

Organizations 
Yeshivat Chovevei Torah (headed by Linzer)

Works

References

External links 
Linzer's Blog

Living people
American Modern Orthodox rabbis
People from the Bronx
Open Orthodox Jews
1966 births
20th-century American rabbis
21st-century American rabbis
Yeshivat Har Etzion